St. Louis is a major center of media in Missouri and the Midwestern United States. The following is a list of media outlets based in the city.

Print

Magazines
Feast, local dining, monthly
Gazelle Magazine
Missouri Lawyers Weekly, regional legal news, weekly
Sauce Magazine, local dining, monthly
Yoga & Spa Magazine, fitness and lifestyle, quarterly
St. Louis Magazine, general interest, monthly

Newspapers
The St. Louis Post-Dispatch is the city's primary newspaper, published daily.

Other papers published in Greater St. Louis include:
The St. Louis American, local African-American news, weekly
St. Louis Business Journal, business news, weekly
The Riverfront Times, progressive alternative weekly
St. Louis Jewish Light, Jewish religious news, weekly
St. Louis Reporter, Christian religious news, owned by the Lutheran Church–Missouri Synod, monthly
St. Louis Review, Christian religious news, owned by the Archdiocese of St. Louis, weekly
The following is a list of student newspapers at colleges in Greater St. Louis:
The University News, St. Louis University, weekly
The Current, University of Missouri–St. Louis, weekly
Student Life, Washington University in St. Louis, published Monday, Wednesday, Friday
Webster University Journal, Webster University, weekly
Pawprint, Maryville University, weekly
St. Louis Community College has a student newspaper for each of its campuses:

 The Forum, Florissant Valley
 The Scene, Forest Park
 The Montage, Meramec

Digital 
InsideSTL.com is a website covering local entertainment and culture.

Radio
The St. Louis radio market includes the city itself, six counties in east-central Missouri, and four counties in southwestern Illinois. In its Fall 2013 ranking of radio markets by population, Arbitron ranked the St. Louis market 22nd in the United States.

The following is a list of radio stations which broadcast from and/or are licensed to the city of St. Louis:

AM

FM

Television
The St. Louis television market includes the city itself, 14 counties in east-central Missouri, and 15 counties in southwestern Illinois. In its Fall 2013 ranking of television markets by population, Arbitron ranked the St. Louis market 21st in the United States.

The following is a list of television stations that broadcast from and/or are licensed to St. Louis.

References

Saint Louis
Mass media in St. Louis